Gramzda Parish is an administrative unit of South Kurzeme Municipality in the Courland region of Latvia. The parish has a population of 732 (as of 1/07/2013) and covers an area of 84.69 km2.

Villages of Gramzda parish 
 Aizvīķi
 Dāma
 Gramzda
 Laukmuiža
 Mazdāma

References

Parishes of Latvia
South Kurzeme Municipality
Courland